Money, Explained is a 2021 docuseries. The 5-episode series, a spin-off of Explained, is narrated by Tiffany Haddish, Jane Lynch, Edie Falco, Bobby Cannavale, and Marcia Gay Harden. The series was produced by Vox Media and released on May 11, 2021, on Netflix.

Episodes

See also 

 Explained (TV series)
 Vox Media

References

External links
 
 

2021 American television series debuts
2021 American television series endings
2020s American documentary television series
American television spin-offs
English-language Netflix original programming
Netflix original documentary television series
Vox Media